Hugo Dellien was the defending champion but chose not to defend his title.

Genaro Alberto Olivieri won the title after defeating Tomás Martín Etcheverry 6–7(3–7), 7–6(7–5), 6–3 in the final.

Seeds

Draw

Finals

Top half

Bottom half

References

External links
Main draw
Qualifying draw

Uruguay Open - 1
2022 Singles